The Kuzuzangpo Tour was Bhutan's first concert tour by rapper Kezang Dorji. The tour began on September 17, 2016 at Paro and concluded on October 22, 2016 in Thimphu. With the Kuzuzangpo Tour, Kezang made history as the first ever Bhutanese artist to tour the country as a solo artist.

Background 
Kezang Dorji shared with Kuensel that he always dreamt of touring the country as a Bhutanese rapper. He had spent a long time working on it and in 2016 he decided to do the tour.

The rapper took the initiative to see if concert tours in Bhutan would work. He mentioned in a post-tour interview that he wanted his tour to be a pilot test for other accomplished singers that have contributed a lot to the music industry in Bhutan. If his tour succeeded or failed, it will be a lesson for all the other artists.

The tour was also a step towards achieving a stronger and more independent Bhutanese music industry.

While on tour Kezang also donated storybooks to schools and children.

The tour was hosted in 12 venues in nine districts of Bhutan.

Shows

References 

Concert tours of Asia
2016 concert tours
Bhutanese hip hop